Raymond Tyson, better known by his stage name Ray Luv, is an American Bay Area rapper from Santa Rosa, California, United States, who is best known for his contribution to the Bay Area hip hop scene in the mid 1990s.

Biography
Raymond Tyson was born on April 15, 1972, in New Orleans, Louisiana, and was raised in Santa Rosa, California.

Career
Early in his career Ray Luv performed alongside Tupac Shakur in the group Strictly Dope, a group based in Santa Rosa, California. In 1991, Ray was signed to the independent label Young Black Brotha Records by fellow friends Mac Dre and Mac Mall. Ray Luv has stated that he got his name from Tupac Shakur.

His first extended play Who Can Be Trusted? was released in 1993 by Young Black Brotha "Get Your Money On" from Trusted was popular on local radio at the time. That next year, Luv was featured on the Above The Rim soundtrack. Forever Hustlin', released in 1995 by Interscope Records through the Bay Area label Young Black Brotha, was his major label debut; it reached #21 on the Billboard Top R&B/Hip Hop Albums chart.

One of Ray Luv's biggest singles "Last Nite", music video was directed by Tupac Shakur in 1994. He was longtime friends with Tupac and fellow Bay Area rappers, Mac Dre and Mac Mall.

In 1997, Luv contributed to the Bay Area rap compilation, Best Of Da Bay: A Series Of Slaps, from Young Black Brotha.

Ray Luv is co-owner of the bay area favorite online video series Pushin' The Bay TV, alongside the show's host Emcee T, a rapper who is also from Santa Rosa, California

Discography
Studio albums

Collaboration albumsPopulation Control with Crimeseen (2006)

Compilation albumsBlack Wall Street with JT the Bigga Figga & Mac Mall (2003)

Extended playsWho Can Be Trusted?'' (1993)

Singles

Guest appearances

References

External links

1972 births
African-American male rappers
Atlantic Records artists
Living people
People from Santa Rosa, California
Rappers from the San Francisco Bay Area
Gangsta rappers
21st-century American rappers
21st-century American male musicians
21st-century African-American musicians
20th-century African-American people